Saddle Creek 50 is a compilation by Saddle Creek Records in honor of being the label's 50th album release. It was released in 2003 and features one album track and one non-album track by each of the bands then recording for the label.

Track listing

CD version

Disc 1
 The Faint – "Worked Up So Sexual" from Blank-Wave Arcade
 The Faint – "Take Me to the Hospital"
 Now It's Overhead – "Wonderful Scar" from their self-titled
 Now It's Overhead – "Dark Cycle"
 Rilo Kiley – "With Arms Outstretched" from The Execution of all Things
 Rilo Kiley – "Jenny, You’re Barely Alive"
 Cursive – "The Martyr" from Cursive's Domestica
 Cursive – "Nonsense"
 Son, Ambulance – "A Book Laid on Its Binding" from Euphemystic
 Son, Ambulance – "The Moral of Rosa, Parolee"

Enhanced CD content: All 45 of Saddle Creek's online weekly movies from 2002.

Disc 2
 Desaparecidos – "Man and Wife, The Latter (Damaged Goods)" from Read Music/Speak Spanish
 Desaparecidos – "Popn' Off at the F"
 The Good Life – "I am an Island" from Black Out
 The Good Life – "Aftercrash"
 Azure Ray – "November" from the November EP
 Azure Ray – "Beautiful Things Can Come From the Dark"
 Sorry About Dresden – "Sick and Soar" from Let It Rest
 Sorry About Dresden – "People Have Parties"
 Mayday – "Captain" from Old Blood
 Mayday – "Pond Love"
 Bright Eyes – "Something Vague" from Fevers and Mirrors
 Bright Eyes – "One Foot In Front of the Other"

LP version
Note: Vinyl version only has the 11 new songs – it does not contain the 11 previously released tracks.

Side 1
 The Faint – "Take Me to the Hospital"
 Now It's Overhead – "Dark Cycle"
 Rilo Kiley – "Jenny, You’re Barely Alive"
 Cursive – "Nonsense"
 Son, Ambulance – "The Moral of Rosa, Parolee"

Side 2
 Desaparecidos – "Popn' Off at the F"
 The Good Life – "Aftercrash"
 Azure Ray – "Beautiful Things Can Come From the Dark"
 Sorry About Dresden – "People Have Parties"
 Mayday – "Pond Love"
 Bright Eyes – "One Foot In Front of the Other"

See also
Lagniappe

External links
Saddle Creek Records

Record label compilation albums
2002 compilation albums
Saddle Creek Records compilation albums
Rock compilation albums